This is a list of songs that reached number one on the Billboard Mainstream Top 40 (or Pop Songs) chart in 2019.

During 2019, a total of 15 singles hit number-one on the charts.

Chart history

See also
2019 in American music

References

External links
Current Billboard Pop Songs chart

Billboard charts
Mainstream Top 40 2019
United States Mainstream Top 40